Efrain Gonzalez Jr. (born 1948) is an American politician and convicted felon who served as a member of the New York State Senate from 1990 to 2008.

Early life 
Gonzalez was born in Coamo, Puerto Rico, and his family moved to mainland United States shortly thereafter. Gonzalez was raised in The Bronx.

Career 
Prior to his election to the State Senate, Gonzalez worked as the union representative for the Transport Workers Union, and subsequently, the union representative for Local 820 of the International Brotherhood of Teamsters from 1969 until 1979, which was during his employment at Brinks Armored Car Service.

Gonzalez was elected to the New York State Senate in 1989, in a special election to replace Israel Ruiz Jr., who had been expelled upon conviction of fraud charges. He was the Chairman of the Minority Conference in the Senate, as well as Chairman Emeritus of the National Hispanic Caucus of State Legislators, and Chairman of the New York State Puerto Rican/Hispanic Task Force. He also was President of the National Hispanic Policy Institute and on the Executive Committee of the Parliamentary Confederation of the Americas.

Arrest and conviction
On August 25, 2006, Gonzalez was indicted on federal mail fraud charges. He was accused of taking $37,412 from November 2000 to May 2006 from the West Bronx Neighborhood Association, a nonprofit organization he founded, and using it for personal expenses, including New York Yankees tickets and membership fees at a vacation club in the Dominican Republic. He surrendered to federal authorities when his indictment was unsealed, and released on $25,000 bail following his arraignment the same day.

Despite being under indictment, González was re-elected in a landslide to his State Senate seat in November 2006.

A superseding indictment followed on December 12, 2006, accusing Gonzalez and others of mail fraud and theft of federal funds in a conspiracy to steal $423,000 through a complicated scheme that involved funneling the money through the West Bronx Neighborhood Association and the United Latin American Foundation, another not-for-profit group. As in the first set of charges, he was also accused of using state money and about $40,000 in federal grants for membership fees in a vacation club, rent and renovations for homes used by his wife and mother-in-law, and items like Yankees tickets, jewelry and college tuition for his daughter, and designing and printing labels for cigars produced by a company he owned.

The case against Gonzalez was delayed because of concurrent investigations of other New York State lawmakers, and he was challenged in the 2008 Democratic primary by Pedro Espada Jr., who had previously been a New York State Senator in an adjoining district. Despite backing from the New York State Democratic party, Gonzalez lost the primary election.

On May 7, 2009, Gonzalez pleaded guilty to two counts of mail fraud and two counts of conspiracy. The five other charges against him in the indictment, including money laundering, fraud, and the abuse of his office, were dropped. Neil Berger and Miguel Castanos, co-defendants who were involved in the scheme with the non-profit organizations and indicted with Gonzalez, also pleaded guilty, and Lucia Sanchez, a fourth defendant, went to trial.

Early in 2010, Gonzalez tried to withdraw his guilty plea, claiming that his first lawyer, Murray Richman, a friend who had represented him without charge, "seemed wholly uninterested in trial preparation, wanted me to plead guilty and was pressuring me to produce this outcome," that beyond interviewing a few minor witnesses, he did not pursue other key witnesses, and that he did not thoroughly review discovery materials that the government made available to the defense. However, U.S. District Court Judge William H. Pauley III, the trial judge, refused to allow Gonzalez to withdraw his plea, stating that the request "presents the paradigm of the defendant who attempts to undermine the integrity of the judicial process" and "the notion that the free will of a longtime New York state senator was overridden by the imminence of trial, coercion by his attorney, or pressure from this court is preposterous."

The following month, Gonzalez was sentenced to seven years in federal prison and ordered to forfeit $737,775. The prison sentence was subsequently upheld on appeal, although a portion of the financial restitution was set aside.

Gonzalez completed his sentence on August 3, 2016. Espada, his replacement in the State Senate, was also convicted of federal crimes and is serving a five-year prison term that is scheduled to end in October 2017.

Personal life 
Gonzalez was married on July 20, 1969, and has four children with his wife. He and his first wife divorced in March 1987.

References

	

1948 births
American politicians of Puerto Rican descent
Living people
Democratic Party New York (state) state senators
Hispanic and Latino American state legislators in New York (state)
American trade union officials convicted of crimes
New York (state) politicians convicted of crimes
People from Coamo, Puerto Rico
Politicians convicted of mail and wire fraud
New York (state) politicians convicted of corruption
Politicians from the Bronx
International Brotherhood of Teamsters people